Jon Robert Muir OAM (born 1961) is an Australian mountaineer who has hiked through many terrains, supporting himself through his travels, becoming very skilled at hiking, hunting and finding resources. He is well known for hiking alone across Australia, the North pole, South pole, Mt. Everest and kayaking in the ocean. He has many different achievements that are listed below, in chronological order.

Biography
Muir grew up in Australia. He began adventuring after being inspired while sailing with a friend. He started rock climbing professionally. At age sixteen, Muir decided to drop out of school and pursue adventuring and climbing full time, beginning in New Zealand. He climbed Mount Everest solo and hiked across Australia without assistance or re-supply.

Muir lives on an off-grid property, adjacent to the Grampian ranges in Victoria, Australia.

Achievements

See also
 Alone Across Australia
 List of people who have walked across Australia
 Australian Geographic Society Adventure Awards

References

External links
 Jon Muir's website via the Wayback Machine

1961 births
Living people
Australian mountain climbers
Recipients of the Medal of the Order of Australia
Australian summiters of Mount Everest